WVBE-FM (100.1 MHz "The Vibe") is a commercial radio station licensed to Lynchburg, Virginia, and serving Metro Lynchburg.  It is owned and operated by Mel Wheeler, Inc., with studios and offices on Electric Road in Roanoke.  WVBE-FM 100.1 and WVBB 97.7 in Elliston-Lafayette, Virginia, simulcast an urban adult contemporary radio format, with WVBB serving the Roanoke metropolitan area.  Each weekday in AM drive time, The Vibe carries The Steve Harvey Morning Show.

WVBE-FM has an effective radiated power (ERP) of 20,000 watts as a Class C3 station.  The transmitter is on Country Living Lane in Madison Heights, near U.S. Route 29 (Monacan Parkway).  WVBE-FM broadcasts using HD Radio technology.  The HD-2 digital subchannel carries a mainstream rock format, known as "The Rock Channel."

History

WWOD-FM
Its original call sign was WWOD-FM, powered at just 940 watts. It simulcast the programming of its sister station, WWOD 1390 AM, now WPLI. WWOD 1390 went on the air the year before, as Lynchburg's second AM radio station after WLVA. WWOD-AM-FM were network affiliates of the Mutual Broadcasting System, carrying its schedule of dramas, comedies, variety shows, news and sports, during the "Golden Age of Radio."  

As network programming moved from radio to television, WWOD-AM-FM began broadcasting a full service radio format of middle of the road and country music plus news and sports with some Christian radio shows on the schedule.  FM 100.1's power was boosted to 3,000 watts.

Country and Top 40
FM 100.1 started its own format, becoming WKZZ, on May 12, 1979.  WKZZ played automated country music.  On April 1, 1984, it became a locally programmed Top 40 station.  It kept that format for seven years.

On November 21, 1991, the station was purchased by Aylett Coleman of Roanoke and began a simulcast with CHR - Top 40 station 92.3 WXLK "K92" in Roanoke.  The simulcast was designed to provide an improved signal for K92 in Metro Lynchburg.  It took the call sign WLYK, which stood for "Lynchburg's K92."  The following year, WLYK boosted power to 20,000 watts, going from a Class A to Class C3 station.  WLYK and WXLK were sold a few years after Coleman's death to Mel Wheeler Inc.

100.1 The Vibe
On April 19, 2001, the station became Vibe 100, with an R&B format.  It changed its call letters to WVBE-FM on March 13, 2002. The change was necessitated by the addition of 610 AM as a Roanoke-based simulcast signal for "Vibe 100", which took the calls WVBE.  In 2016, the simulcast ended when WVBE 610 AM flipped to sports.  WVBE-FM got a new simulcast partner in the Roanoke area when WVBB 97.7 started airing the same Urban AC programming.

On January 20, 2016, WVBE-FM started using HD Radio technology in its broadcasts.  The HD-2 subchannel began carrying "The Rock Channel," a mainstream rock format.

References

External links
 The Vibe Online
 

VBE-FM
Radio stations established in 1948
Urban adult contemporary radio stations in the United States